The shopping galleries in Brussels are multiple covered walkways in the center of the capital city of Belgium. The galleries form glass-roofed pedestrian streets on which shops are situated.

History

Most of these gallery "passages" were built in the first half of the 19th century. Brussels had about 50 such galleries around 1850, of which a few still exist.

List of arcade galleries in Brussels

References
  About the Horta Gallery
  History about Ravenstein

Buildings and structures in Brussels
Shopping malls in Belgium